Multispectral segmentation is a method for differentiating tissue classes of similar characteristics in a single imaging modality using several independent images of the same anatomical slice in different modalities (e.g., T2, proton density, T1, etc.). This makes it easier to discriminate between different tissues, as each tissue responds differently to particular pulse sequences.

See also 
Magnetic resonance imaging

Further reading
Fletcher LM, Barsotti JB, Hornak JP. A multispectral analysis of brain images. Magn Reson Med 1993; 29:623-630.  
Jackson EF, Narayana PA, Falconer JC. Reproducibility of nonparametric feature map for determination of normal human intracranial volumes with MR imaging data. J. Magn. Reson. Imag 1994; 4:692-700. 
Vannier MW, Butterfield RL, Jordan D, Murphy WA, Levitt RG, Gado M. Multispectral analysis of magnetic resonance images. Radiology 1985; 154:221-224. 

Magnetic resonance imaging